NGC 336 is a spiral galaxy in the constellation Cetus. It was discovered on October 31, 1885 by Francis Leavenworth. It was described by Dreyer as "very faint, small, round, suddenly brighter middle." It is also known as PGC 3470. Despite this, sometimes it is mistakenly identified as PGC 3526.

References

0336
18851031
Cetus (constellation)
Spiral galaxies
003470